The Canadian Association of Elizabeth Fry Societies (CAEFS) is an association of groups operating under the Elizabeth Fry Society banner, similar in many respects to the John Howard Society. The Elizabeth Fry Society groups work on issues affecting women, girls and gender diverse people in the justice system. The societies take their name from prison reformer Elizabeth Fry.

The organization was started in 1969, with formal incorporation as a non-profit organization occurring in 1978. They help women, girls and gender diverse people to re-integrate into society when they have been in prison or otherwise affected by the criminal justice system. They work independently from the government.

The original Elizabeth Fry Society of Canada was founded in 1939 by Member of Parliament Agnes Macphail.

The current Executive Director of CAEFS is Emilie Coyle.

The Elizabeth Fry Society has also assisted women and gender diverse people who face criminal proceedings.  They have had intervenor status in a number of Supreme Court of Canada cases including R v Ryan, in which Nicole Patricia Ryan was arrested by the Royal Canadian Mounted Police after attempting to hire an undercover officer as a hitman to kill her husband.  The RCMP were criticized by the Supreme Court for failing to protect Ryan from an abusive husband, however both the husband and the RCMP denied the reported abuse. The husband was not called to testify during the trial.

See also 
 Canadian Association of Elizabeth Fry Societies
 John Howard Society

External links
CAEFS website

Non-profit organizations based in Ottawa
Prison reform
Women's organizations based in Canada
Prisoner support
1939 establishments in Canada
Organizations established in 1939
Advocacy groups in Canada